Predrag Ostojić (22 February 1938 — 5 July 1996) was a Yugoslav chess player. Born in Kraljevo, he won the Yugoslav Chess Championship in 1968 and 1971. FIDE awarded Ostojić the title of International Master in 1968, and Grandmaster in 1975.

Tournament victories include equal 1st place at Vrnjačka Banja 1975, 1st at Paris 1968, 1969 and 1970, San Juan 1971, Casablanca 1974, Hasselt 1974. Second places include Beverwijk 1968, Olot 1974, and Cleveland 1975. His 5-year best rating was 2480, according to Arpad Elo.

Ostojić died on 5 July 1996 in Mainz, Germany, after falling from a hotel window. The circumstances of his death remain a mystery.

Reference

External links
Predrag Ostojic games at 365Chess.com

1938 births
1996 deaths
Chess grandmasters
Yugoslav chess players
Sportspeople from Kraljevo
20th-century chess players